Solar power in Illinois has been increasing, as the cost of photovoltaics has decreased. As of the end of 2020, Illinois had 465 megawatts (MW) of installed photovoltaic and concentrated solar power capacity combined employing over 5,200 jobs. Illinois adopted a net metering rule which allows customers generating up to 40 kW to use net metering, with the kilowatt hour surplus rolled over each month, and lost at the end of either April or October, as selected by the customer. In 2011, the limit was raised to 2 MW, but is not net metering, as the term is commonly known, as it uses two meters for systems larger than 40 kW.

As of 2022, Illinois ranks 17th nationally in cumulative installed solar capacity. There is enough solar energy installed in the state to power 217,000 homes.

History
The first experimental solar power plant was in 1902, in Olney, Illinois, by H.E. Willsie and John Boyle, and was based on a design by Charles Tellier. In 1904 they set up the Willsie Sun company in St. Louis, and built a 6-horsepower motor.

In 2002, Illinois's largest solar array was the 99.4 kW array on the roof of the Field Museum of Natural History, in Chicago.

In 2010 the country's largest urban solar array, 10 MW, was installed in West Pullman, on Chicago's south side. In 2012, IKEA installed solar PV on its two stores in Bolingbrook and Schaumburg totaling almost 2 MW. Also in 2012, the 20 MW Grand Ridge Solar Plant in LaSalle County was completed. The University of Illinois built a 5.87 MW solar farm in 2015 which will provide 2% of the university's electricity.

In November 2016, ComEd attempted to add additional fees to the bills of only residential solar users, commonly called demand charges, in the text of a wider energy bill. They were eventually pulled out of the bill, which passed in December 2016 without them.

Statistics

See also

List of power stations in Illinois#Solar photovoltaic
Wind power in Illinois
Solar power in the United States
Renewable energy in the United States

References

External links

 GA Mansoori, N Enayati, LB Agyarko (2016), Energy: Sources, Utilization, Legislation, Sustainability, Illinois as Model State, World Sci. Pub. Co., 
Illinois Solar Energy Association
Incentives and policies

Energy in Illinois
Illinois